Abdel Moneim El-Guindi (12 June 1936 – 17 March 2011) was an amateur Egyptian flyweight boxer. He competed for the United Arab Republic at the 1960 Summer Olympics and won a bronze medal.

References

External links
Abdel Moneim El-Guindi's obituary 

1936 births
2011 deaths
Olympic boxers of Egypt
Olympic bronze medalists for Egypt
Boxers at the 1960 Summer Olympics
Olympic medalists in boxing
Egyptian male boxers
Sportspeople from Alexandria
Medalists at the 1960 Summer Olympics
Mediterranean Games gold medalists for Egypt
Mediterranean Games medalists in boxing
Competitors at the 1959 Mediterranean Games
Flyweight boxers
20th-century Egyptian people